Ogawa (written:  lit. Notable people with the surname include:

, American poet
, Japanese footballer
 Frank H. Ogawa (1917–1994), the first Japanese American to serve on the Oakland, CA City Council
 Hiroshi Ogawa (disambiguation), several people
, Japanese racing driver
, Japanese cabinet minister
, a Japanese novelist, lyricist and translator, born in 1973
, Japanese ice hockey player
, Japanese photographer
, Japanese boxer
, Japanese sprinter
, Japanese noted kamikaze pilot
 Koki Ogawa (disambiguation), multiple people
, retired Japanese army aviator
, Japanese pop singer and actress best known as a former member of Morning Musume
, Japanese television personality and gravure idol
, Japanese chemist
, a.k.a. Shido Nakamura
, Japanese judoka/wrestler/mixed martial artist
, Japanese sailor
, Japanese classical pianist
, Japanese actress
, Japanese footballer
, Japanese developer of Functional MRI, 2003 winner of the Japan Prize
, Japanese documentary film director
 Shoot Ogawa (born 1974), magician
, Japanese daimyō
, Japanese musician
, Japanese basketball player and coach
, Japanese volleyball player
, Japanese politician
, Japanese author
, Japanese businesswoman
, Japanese wrestler
, Japanese footballer
, Japanese judoka

Fictional characters
 Alyssa Ogawa (Star Trek)
, (Good Luck!!)
 (Kamen Rider Ryuki)
 (F3: Frantic, Frustrated & Female)
 (High School Girls)
 (Bleach)
 (Red String)
, (Gender-Swap at the Delinquent Academy)
 (Battle Royale)
 Sanshiro Ogawa (Natsume Soseki no Sanshiro)
 (Kocchi Muite! Miiko)

See also
 Japanese name

References

Japanese-language surnames